Caspar Poyck (born 1973, Sittard) is a Dutch-American actor, public speaker, psychodigestive therapist and chef of Dutch descent.

He was born in Limburg in the Netherlands, the son of a yoga-teacher and jazz-trombone player and vocalist, Noël Poyck (died 1986), and Nanny, who became a yoga teacher after her husband's death.

Caspar and his brother Maarten grew up in a town neighboring Sittard, Geleen, where the family moved soon after his birth.

Caspar started his entertainment career as a drummer and later singer in various rock-bands. Garnering some success playing at the Limelight Club in London and recording for BBC Radio 1, he then travelled across the United States and settled in Los Angeles in 1994.

Years of producing and directing television, taking acting classes and world travel filled his first decade in the U.S., and he never auditioned for any acting work.  This all changed at the beginning of 2003 when he travelled to the Middle East and Africa.  In South Africa he landed the Mailman character in the Warner Bros. film Racing Stripes.

In 2006 he appeared in Color of the Cross.

To coincide with the release of the much delayed Brad Pitt film  The Assassination of Jesse James by the Coward Robert Ford Caspar appeared as the lead character Jesse James in The History Channel's one-hour special The Plot to Kill Jesse James now on DVD Jesse James:American Outlaw.

References

External links

 http://www.whatmakesyoueat.com/

1973 births
Living people
American television directors
Dutch emigrants to the United States
Dutch musicians
People from Sittard